Hotel Windermere was a hotel in Hyde Park, Chicago, United States, located at 56th Street and Cornell Avenue. It was built in 1892 for the Columbian Exposition. In 1924 it was rebuilt with a West and East hotel under Rapp & Rapp, who also built the Chicago Theatre and the Tivoli Theatre. The 12-story hotel had 482 guest rooms and 200 apartments and had a tunnel connecting the two hotels. Over the years Windermere East attracted guests such as John Rockefeller, Philip Roth, George Burns and Gracie Allen, and American football teams.  Windermere West was demolished in 1959 to make way for a parking lot, and in 1981 Windermere East was converted into apartments and placed on the National Register of Historic Places a year later under the title Hotel Windermere East.

See also
National Register of Historic Places listings in South Side Chicago

References

Hotels established in 1892
Hotel buildings completed in 1924
Hotel Windermere
Demolished hotels in Chicago